Invader is a 2012 Spanish-French action thriller film directed by Daniel Calparsoro which stars Alberto Ammann, Antonio de la Torre, Karra Elejalde and Inma Cuesta. It is based on Fernando Marías's work Invasor.

Plot 
Pablo, a Spanish military physician, suffers an attack in Iraq that leaves him badly wounded. Upon returning home with his wife Ángela and daughter Pilar, a recovering Pablo begins to cast doubt on the official version of the events.

Cast

Production 
Based on the novel Invasor by Fernando Marías, the screenplay was penned by Javier Gullón and Jorge Arenillas. The film was produced by Vaca Films and Morena Films in co-production with Mandarin, with the participation and collaboration of TVE, Canal+, Ono, TVG, and Xunta de Galicia. The film was shot in Fuerteventura and Lanzarote (in the Canary Islands) as well as in A Coruña (Galicia).

Release 
Distributed by Buena Vista International, the film was theatrically released in Spain on 30 November 2012.

Reception 
Irene Crespo of Cinemanía rated the film 3 out of 5 stars, assessing the conspiracy-heavy film to "go all in in the action side and falling halfway in the thriller side", featuring "action scenes perfectly choreographed and sized to the needs of the story, making for an enjoyable time", with the story losing credibility as it delves into the protagonist's moral dilemmas.

Pere Vall of Fotogramas rated the film 2 out of 5 stars, considering that the backdrop (involving plots and corruption) in which the mishaps of the protagonist take place is not sketched adequately enough, while citing some action scenes and the cast's soundness to be among the best things about the film.

Jonathan Holland of Variety deemed the film—"a Spanish contribution to the burgeoning genre of Iraq-themed anti-war movies"—to be a "highly charged, good-looking but deeply flawed thriller about governmental spin".

Raquel Hernández Luján of HobbyConsolas scored 70 out of 100 points ("good"), considering the "fabulous" cinematography as well as the choice of camera shots to be the best things about the film, while singling out the film's failure to thrill (or convince) in its central section and the way information is provided to be the worst things about it.

Accolades 

|-
| align = "center" rowspan = "16" | 2013 || rowspan = "5" | 27th Goya Awards || Best Adapted Screenplay || Javier Gullón, Jorge Arenillas ||  || rowspan = "5" | 
|-
| Best Supporting Actor || Antonio de la Torre ||  
|-
| Best Editing || Antonio Frutos, David Pinillos ||  
|-
| Best Sound || Sergio Bürmann, Nicolás de Poulpiquet, James Muñoz ||  
|-
| Best Special Effects || Reyes Abades, Isidro Jiménez ||  
|-
| rowspan = "11" | 11th Mestre Mateo Awards || colspan = "2" | Best Feature Film ||  || rowspan = "11" | 
|-
| rowspan = "2" | Best Supporting Actor || Antonio de la Torre || 
|-
| Karra Elejalde || 
|-
| Best Supporting Actress || Inma Cuesta || 
|-
| Best Direction || Daniel Calparsoro || 
|-
| Best Art Direction || Juan Pedro de Gaspar || 
|-
| Best Screenplay || Javier Gullón, Jorge Arenillas || 
|-
| Best Editing || Antonio Frutos, David Pinillos || 
|-
| Best Sound || Sergio Bürmann, James Muñoz, Nicolás de Poulpiquet || 
|-
| Best Makeup and Hairstyles || Raquel F. Fidalgo, Paco Rodríguez || 
|-
| Best Production Supervision || Jordi Berenguer || 
|}

See also 
 List of Spanish films of 2012

References

External links 
 Invader at ICAA's Catálogo de Cinespañol

2012 action thriller films
Spanish action thriller films
Morena Films films
Vaca Films films
Iraq War films
Films shot in Galicia (Spain)
Films shot in the Canary Islands
Films based on Spanish novels
French action thriller films
2010s Spanish films
2010s French films